Johan Munck (born 7 February 1943) is a Swedish lawyer and former President of the Supreme Court of Sweden (2007–2010). Since 2010, he is the editor of the Swedish code of laws.

Career
Johan Munck was born in Malmö, Skåne County, the adopted son of the lawyer and former mayor of Malmö Thomas Munck af Rosenschöld. He received a Candidate of Law degree from Lund University in 1966. In 1974 he was employed as an associate judge (hovrättsassessor) at the Skåne and Blekinge Court of Appeal in Malmö. The same year he was employed at the Ministry of Justice where he served as a legal adviser (sakkunnig) until 1979, assistant undersecretary (departementsråd) and head of the criminal law unit (straffrättsenheten) from 1979 to 1983, and as  director-general for legal affairs (rättschef) from 1983 to 1987. In 1987 he was appointed as Justice of the Supreme Court of Sweden. On 1 February 2007, he was appointed as President of the Supreme Court following the retirement of Bo Svensson.

Johan Munck has served as a commissioner of several Swedish government commissions and committees, such as the Committee on Genetical Integrity (Kommittén om genetisk integritet), the September 11 Commission (11 september-utredningen) and the Stock Market Security Paper Commission (Värdepappersmarknadsutredningen). He has served as chairman of the Swedish Stock Market Committee (Aktiemarknadsnämnden), the Disciplinary Committee of the Stockholm Stock Exchange (Stockholmsbörsens disciplinnämnd), the Swedish Broadcasting Commission (Granskningsnämnden för Radio och TV) and the Swedish National Collections of Music (Statens musiksamlingar). From 1979 to 1988 he was a judicial assistant to the Supreme Commander of the Swedish Armed Forces. He has authored several books and articles related to criminal and civil law.

He is married to Kerstin Munck (née Palmquist) and has three children. He lives with his family in Sollentuna north of Stockholm. He is an outspoken Feminist.

References

1943 births
Living people
People from Malmö
Lund University alumni
Presidents of the Supreme Court of Sweden
Swedish feminists
Male feminists
People from Sollentuna Municipality